Phil Gilmartin,  is a British molecular biologist and botanist, who specialises in plant genetics. Since 2011, he has been Professor of Plant Molecular Genetics and Executive Dean of the Faculty of Science at the University of East Anglia (UEA). He had previously been Director of the Centre for Plant Sciences (1998–2004) and Pro-Dean for Research in the Faculty of Biological Sciences (2004–2007) at the University of Leeds, and Principal of St Mary's College, Durham (2008–2011).

References

 

 
 
 

Living people
Year of birth missing (living people)
British molecular biologists
British botanists
Plant geneticists
Academics of the University of Leeds
Academics of Durham University
Academics of the University of East Anglia
Fellows of the Linnean Society of London